

G

References

Lists of words